Mackenziaena is a genus of bird in the family Thamnophilidae.
First circumscribed by Charles Chubb in 1918, it contains the following species :
 Large-tailed antshrike (Mackenziaena leachii)
 Tufted antshrike (Mackenziaena severa)

The genus commemorates Helen Mackenzie McConnell, who was the wife of English collector Frederick McConnell.

References

External links

 
Bird genera
 
Taxonomy articles created by Polbot